Streptomyces litmocidini is a bacterium species from the genus of Streptomyces which has been isolated from soil. Streptomyces litmocidini produces granaticin and litmocidin.

See also 
 List of Streptomyces species

References

Further reading

External links
Type strain of Streptomyces litmocidini at BacDive -  the Bacterial Diversity Metadatabase	

litmocidini
Bacteria described in 1958